The following is a list of notable deaths in February 2023.

Entries for each day are listed alphabetically by surname. A typical entry lists information in the following sequence:
 Name, age, country of citizenship at birth, subsequent country of citizenship (if applicable), reason for notability, cause of death (if known), and reference.

February 2023

1
Angel Alcala, 93, Filipino biologist, president of Silliman University (1991–1992), secretary of environment and natural resources (1992–1995) and chairperson of the CHED (1995–1999).
Hans Alsén, 96, Swedish politician, MP (1974–1982), governor of Uppsala County (1986–1992).
Renato Benaglia, 84, Italian football player (Fiorentina, Catania, Roma) and coach.
Joanne Bracker, 77, American Hall of Fame college basketball coach (Midland University), cancer.
Don Bramlett, 60, American football player (Minnesota Vikings).
Jozef Čapla, 84, Slovak ice hockey player (HC Slovan Bratislava, HC Dukla Jihlava, Augsburger EV).
Parimal Dey, 81, Indian footballer (East Bengal FC, Mohun Bagan AC, national team).
Terence Dickinson, 79, Canadian astrophotographer and amateur astronomer, complications from Parkinson's disease.
Benny Dollo, 72, Indonesian football manager (Persita Tangerang, Arema Malang, national team).
Franklin Florence, 88, American civil rights activist.
Billy Galligan, 86, Irish hurler (Avondhu, Blackrock, Cork).
Kit Hesketh-Harvey, 65, British comedian (Kit and The Widow) and screenwriter (Maurice).
Roland Muhlen, 82, American Olympic sprint canoer (1972, 1976).
Leonard Pietraszak, 86, Polish actor (Vabank, Danton, Kingsajz).
Lucy Quintero, 74, Panamanian folk singer, heart attack.
Terry Saldaña, 64, Filipino basketball player (Barangay Ginebra San Miguel, Pop Cola Panthers, Shell Turbo Chargers), kidney disease.
René Schérer, 100, French philosopher.
Dan Suleiman, 80, Nigerian air force officer and politician, governor of Plateau State (1976–1978).
Philippe Tesson, 94, French journalist (Le Quotidien de Paris, Combat).
George P. Wilbur, 81, American actor (Halloween, Remote Control, The Running Man) and stuntman.
Stanley Wilson Jr., 40, American football player (Detroit Lions).
George Zukerman, 95, Canadian bassoonist.

2
Trevor Boys, 65, Canadian racecar driver (NASCAR).
Ron Campbell, 82, American baseball player (Chicago Cubs).
Enzo Carra, 79, Italian journalist and politician, deputy (2001–2013).
Chris Chesser, 74, American film producer (Major League, The Rundown, Bad Day on the Block).
Marcel Duriez, 82, French Olympic hurdler (1960, 1964, 1968).
Peter Facklam, 92, Swiss politician, member of the Executive Council of Basel-Stadt (1980–1992).
Fred la marmotte, Canadian groundhog.
George Hams, 94, Australian footballer (Collingwood).
Gerardo Islas Maldonado, 39, Mexican businessman and politician, member of the Congress of Puebla (2018–2021), heart attack.
Jean-Pierre Jabouille, 80, French racing driver (Formula One, 24 Hours of Le Mans).
Kenny Jay, 85, American professional wrestler (AWA).
Glória Maria, 73, Brazilian journalist and reporter (Fantástico, Globo Repórter), cancer.
Linda Matar, 97, Lebanese women's rights activist.
Butch Miles, 78, American jazz drummer.
Mohammed Saeed Al Mulla, 97, Emirati banker and politician.
Dennis Munari, 74, Australian footballer (Carlton, North Melbourne).
Robert Orben, 95, American comedian and speechwriter.
Solomon Perel, 97, German-born Israeli author and motivational speaker (Europa Europa).
Lanny Poffo, 68, Canadian-American professional wrestler (WWF, CWA, ICW), heart failure.
Tim Quy, 61, British musician (Cardiacs).
D. R. Thorpe, 79, British historian and biographer.
Louis Velle, 96, French actor (Stopover in Orly, The Impossible Mr. Pipelet, Kings for a Day).
K. Viswanath, 92, Indian film director (Sankarabharanam, Sagara Sangamam, Saptapadi).
Barbara Wilk, 87, Polish gymnast, Olympic bronze medallist (1956).
James C. Wofford, 78, American equestrian, Olympic silver medalist (1968, 1972).
Richard Woolcott, 95, Australian diplomat, author and commentator, permanent representative to the United Nations (1982–1988).
Takahiro Yokomichi, 82, Japanese politician, twice member and speaker (2009–2012) of the House of Representatives, governor of Hokkaido (1983–1995), cancer.
John Zizioulas, 92, Greek Orthodox prelate, metropolitan of Pergamon (since 1986), COVID-19.

3
Bernard Bardin, 88, French politician, deputy (1981–1993).
Giuseppina Bersani, 73, Italian Olympic fencer (1972).
Anthony Fernandes, 86, Indian Roman Catholic prelate, bishop of Bareilly (1989–2014), multiple organ failure.
Andreas Gielchen, 58, German footballer (1. FC Köln, Alemannia Aachen).
Oswald Gomis, 90, Sri Lankan Roman Catholic prelate and academic administrator, auxiliary bishop (1968–1996) and archbishop (2002–2009) of Colombo, chancellor of the UoC (2002–2021).
Robert Key, 77, English politician, MP (1983–2010) and minister for sport (1992–1993).
Alain Lacouchie, 76, French poet, illustrator, and photographer.
José Luiz de Magalhães Lins, 93, Brazilian banker.
Lawrence M. McKenna, 89, American jurist, judge of the U.S. District Court for Southern New York (since 1990).
Hiroshi Mizuta, 103, Japanese economist and historian, member of the Japan Academy.
Ken Monteith, 84, Canadian politician, MP (1988–1993).
Joan Oates, 94, American-British archaeologist and academic.
Roberto Purini, 85, Brazilian lawyer and politician, São Paulo MLA (1979–1999).
Paco Rabanne, 88, Spanish fashion designer.
Portia Robinson, 96, Australian historian.
Bine Rogelj, 93, Slovene Olympic ski jumper (1956) and caricaturist.
Sergio Solli, 78, Italian actor (Il mistero di Bellavista, I Can Quit Whenever I Want, Ciao, Professore!).
Dante Stefani, 95, Italian partisan and politician, senator (1979–1987).
Irving Stern, 94, American politician, member of the Minnesota Senate (1979–1982).
Jack Taylor, 94, American broadcaster, heart failure.
Ismail Tipi, 64, Turkish-German politician, member of the Landtag of Hesse (since 2010).
Naďa Urbánková, 83, Czech singer and actress (Closely Watched Trains, Larks on a String, Seclusion Near a Forest), complications from cancer and COVID-19.
Juan Velarde, 95, Spanish economist and academic.
Shevah Weiss, 87, Polish-born Israeli politician, member (1981–1999) and speaker (1992–1996) of the Knesset.

4
Luciano Armani, 82, Italian racing cyclist.
Don Blackburn, 84, Canadian ice hockey player (Philadelphia Flyers, New York Islanders, New York Rangers).
César Cordero Moscoso, 95, Ecuadorian Roman Catholic priest.
Elettra Deiana, 81, Italian teacher and politician, deputy (2001–2008).
Léon Engulu, 88, Congolese politician, governor of Katanga (1968–1970), minister of the interior (1990–1991) and senator (2003–2018).
Susan Duhan Felix, 85, American ceramic artist.
Jürgen Flimm, 81, German theater director and manager (Salzburg Festival, Berlin State Opera).
Adrian Hall, 95, American theatre director.
Eugene Iglesias, 96, Puerto Rican actor (Jack McCall, Desperado, Taza, Son of Cochise, The Naked Dawn), heart attack.
Sherif Ismail, 67, Egyptian politician, prime minister (2015–2018).
Vani Jairam, 77, Indian playback singer (Sankarabharanam, Guddi, Sollathaan Ninaikkiren), fall.
Marv Kellum, 70, American football player (Pittsburgh Steelers, St. Louis Cardinals).
Floyd Kerr, 76, American basketball player (Colorado State Rams).
Pete Koegel, 75, American baseball player (Milwaukee Brewers, Philadelphia Phillies).
Sarah Landau, 87, American architectural historian.
Paul Martha, 80, American football player (Pittsburgh Steelers) and executive (San Francisco 49ers).
Alois Mayer, 73, Austrian politician, member of the Municipal Council and Landtag of Vienna (1997–2015).
Roberto Ongpin, 86, Filipino businessman and politician, MP (1978–1984) and minister of commerce and industry (1978–1986).
Edward Pangelinan, 81, Northern Marianan politician, resident representative (1978–1984), pancreatic cancer.
Arnold Schulman, 97, American screenwriter (Love with the Proper Stranger, Goodbye, Columbus, Tucker: The Man and His Dream).
Jerry W. Tillman, 82, American politician, member of the North Carolina Senate (2003–2020).
Ron Tompkins, 78, American baseball player (Kansas City Athletics, Chicago Cubs).
Harry Whittington, 95, American attorney and political figure (Dick Cheney hunting accident), complications from a fall.
Rob Williams, 92, New Zealand army general, chief of the general staff (1981–1984).

5
Hilda Adefarasin, 98, Nigerian women's rights activist.
Hilary Alexander, 77, New Zealand-born British fashion journalist (The Daily Telegraph).
Hank Beebe, 96, American composer (Bathtubs Over Broadway).
Mordechai Bibi, 100, Iraqi-born Israeli politician, MK (1959–1974).
Catherine Bonnet, 57, French tennis player.
Knut Borchardt, 93, German historian.
Chris Browne, 70, American cartoonist (Hägar the Horrible).
Demetrius Calip, 53, American basketball player (Los Angeles Lakers).
Chu Yun-han, 67, Taiwanese political scholar, rectal cancer.
Robin Cocks, 84, British geologist.
Renato Del Ponte, 78, Italian essayist.
Jean Desanlis, 97, French veterinarian and politician, deputy (1972–1997).
Josep Maria Espinàs, 95, Spanish writer ("Cant del Barça"), journalist, and publisher.
T. P. Gajendran, 68, Indian film director (Budget Padmanabhan, Middle Class Madhavan, Banda Paramasivam) and actor.
Geoff Heskett, 93, Australian Olympic basketball player (1956).
Hsing Yun, 95, Chinese Buddhist monk, founder of Fo Guang Shan and Buddha's Light International Association, kidney failure.
Kang Seong-mo, 89, South Korean entrepreneur and politician, MNA (1988–1992).
Abraham Lempel, 86, Polish-born Israeli computer scientist (LZ77 and LZ78).
Pervez Musharraf, 79, Pakistani politician and military officer, president (2001–2008), minister of defence (1999–2002) and chief of Army staff (1998–2007), cardiac amyloidosis.
Khalipha Nando, 81, Filipino Islamic militant, wa'lī of Bangsamoro (since 2019) and co-founder of the Moro Islamic Liberation Front.
John H. Panabaker, 94, Canadian business executive and academic administrator, chancellor of McMaster University (1986–1992).
Gerald Parsons, 89, English cricketer (Cornwall).
Nukun Prachuapmo, 93, Thai politician, minister of transport (1991–1992, 1992).
Inge Sargent, 90, Austrian-American author and human rights activist, queen consort of Hsipaw State (1953–1962).
Takako Sasuga, 87, Japanese voice actress (Sazae-san, Danganronpa).
May Sayegh, 82, Palestinian poet and political activist.
Hansi Schmidt, 80, Romanian-born German handball player (VfL Gummersbach, Steaua București, West Germany national team).
Vladimir Skulachev, 87, Russian biochemist, member of the Russian Academy of Sciences.
Roslyn Swartzman, 91, Canadian printmaker and painter.
Rosa Tavarez, 83, Dominican painter and engraver.
Jusaburō Tsujimura, 89, Japanese puppeteer and doll maker, heart failure.
Kaye Vaughan, 91, American-born Canadian Hall of Fame football player (Ottawa Rough Riders).
Wu Zhongru, 83, Chinese hydraulic engineer, member of the Chinese Academy of Engineering.

6
Moslem Uddin Ahmad, 74, Bangladeshi politician, MP (since 2020), cancer.
Peter Allen, 76, English footballer (Leyton Orient, Millwall).
Greta Andersen, 95, Danish swimmer, Olympic champion (1948).
Janet Anderson, 73, British politician, minister for film, tourism and broadcasting (1998–2001) and MP (1992–2010).
Abdellatif Ben Ammar, 79, Tunisian film director (A Simple Story, Aziza).
Nugraha Besoes, 81, Indonesian football administrator and politician, MP (1977–1992).
Niamh Bhreathnach, 77, Irish politician, twice minister for education, TD (1992–1997) and senator (1997).
Rob Bruniges, 66, British Olympic fencer (1976, 1980, 1984).
Bong Kee Chok, 85, Malaysian political activist.
Jane Dowling, 97, British artist.
Moses Gray, 85, American football player (Indiana Hoosiers, New York Titans).
David Harris, 76, American journalist and anti-war activist.
Emory Kristof, 80, American photographer.
Inge Krogh, 102, Danish politician, MP (1973–1984).
Eugene Lee, 83, American set designer (Saturday Night Live, Candide, Sweeney Todd: The Demon Barber of Fleet Street).
Nicolò Mineo, 89, Italian literary critic, literary historian and philologist.
John Moeti, 55, South African footballer (Orlando Pirates, SuperSport United, national team).
Charlie Norris, 59, American professional wrestler (Pro Wrestling America, WCW).
Květa Pacovská, 94, Czech illustrator and writer.
Pierre-Alain Parot, 72, French stained-glass artist.
Phil Spalding, 65, English bassist (GTR, Original Mirrors, Toyah).
Violet Stanger, 82, Canadian politician, Saskatchewan MLA (1991–1999).
Lubomír Štrougal, 98, Czech politician, prime minister of Czechoslovakia (1970–1988).
Răzvan Theodorescu, 83, Romanian historian and politician, senator (2000–2008) and minister of culture (2000–2004).
Billy Thomson, 64, Scottish footballer (St Mirren, Dundee United, national team).
B. K. S. Varma, 74, Indian painter, heart attack.
Notable people killed during the 2023 Turkey–Syria earthquake:
Christian Atsu, 31, Ghanaian footballer (Newcastle United, Hatayspor, national team)
Nilay Aydogan, 31, Turkish basketball player (national team)
Nader Joukhadar, 45, Syrian football player (Al-Wathba, national team) and manager (Salam Zgharta)
Cemal Kütahya, 32, Turkish handball player (national team)
Taner Savut, 48, Turkish footballer (Fenerbahçe, Siirtspor) and sporting director (Hatayspor)
Yakup Taş, 63, Turkish politician, MP (since 2018)
Zilan Tigris, 50–51, Turkish-Armenian singer
Ahmet Eyüp Türkaslan, 28, Turkish footballer (Osmanlıspor, Ümraniyespor, Yeni Malatyaspor)

7
Tunku Abdul Aziz, 89, Malaysian politician, senator (2009–2012).
Fernando Becerril, 78, Mexican actor (Zapata: el sueño del héroe, The Mask of Zorro, Get the Gringo).
František Cipro, 75, Czech football player and manager (Slavia Prague, Dynamo České Budějovice, Chmel Blšany), colon cancer.
Thibaut de Reimpré, 73–74, French painter.
Pio D'Emilia, 68, Italian journalist (il manifesto, L'Espresso).
Daniel Defert, 85, French sociologist and AIDS activist, founder of AIDES.
Abdelkader Drif, 85, Algerian sporting director.
Karma Ghale, 59, Nepali politician, MP (since 2018), prostate cancer.
Lee Greenfield, 81, American politician, member of the Minnesota House of Representatives (1979–2001).
Dieter Haaßengier, 88, German politician, member of the Landtag of Lower Saxony (1970–1976).
Benet Hytner, 95, English barrister and judge.
Teuku Sama Indra, 58, Indonesian politician, regent of South Aceh (2013–2018).
Makoto Itoh, 86, Japanese economist, heart attack.
Richard Kell, 95, Irish poet, composer, and teacher. (death announced on this date)
Tonya Knight, 56, American professional bodybuilder and game show contestant (American Gladiators), cancer.
Joseph Loeckx, 85, Belgian comic book artist (Clifton, Tintin, La Ribambelle).
Friedel Lutz, 84, German footballer (Eintracht Frankfurt, West Germany national team).
Andrew J. McKenna, 93, American businessman, chairman of McDonald's (2004–2016).
Mendelson Joe, 78, Canadian singer-songwriter, assisted suicide.
Hiroki Nakata, 58, Japanese professional shogi player.
Mati Põldre, 86, Estonian film director (Those Old Love Letters, Georg), screenwriter and cinematographer.
Oleksandr Radchenko, 46, Ukrainian footballer (Dynamo Kyiv, Dnipro, national team).
Alfredo Rizzo, 89, Italian Olympic runner (1960).
Anthony Thiselton, 85, English Anglican priest, theologian and academic.
Leontii Voitovych, 71, Ukrainian historian.
Wolfgang Weber, 83, German engineer and politician, member of the Landtag of Saxony (1990–1994).
Luc Winants, 60, Belgian chess player.
Royden Wood, 92, English footballer (New Brighton, Clitheroe, Leeds United).

8
Burt Bacharach, 94, American Hall of Fame composer ("Raindrops Keep Fallin' on My Head", "Walk On By", "Arthur's Theme (Best That You Can Do)"), six-time Grammy winner.
Miroslav Blažević, 87, Croatian football player (Rijeka) and manager (Dinamo Zagreb, national team), prostate cancer.
Elena Fanchini, 37, Italian Olympic alpine ski racer (2006, 2010, 2014), cancer.
Shirley Fulton, 71, American judge (North Carolina Superior Court), gallbladder cancer.
Arto Heiskanen, 59, Finnish ice hockey player (Porin Ässät, Lukko, Albatros de Brest).
Volkan Kahraman, 43, Austrian football player (Excelsior, SV Pasching, national team) and manager, shot.
Jesús Agustín López de Lama, 93, Spanish Roman Catholic prelate, bishop-prelate of Corocoro (1966–1991).
Cody Longo, 34, American actor (Hollywood Heights, Days of Our Lives, Piranha 3D).
Dennis Lotis, 97, South African-born British singer and actor (It's a Wonderful World, The City of the Dead, What Every Woman Wants).
Igor Mangushev, 36, Russian nationalist and mercenary, founder of the E.N.O.T. Corp., shot.
Subimal Mishra, 79, Indian novelist.
Vladimir Ivanovich Morozov, 82, Turkmen sprint canoeist, triple Olympic champion (1964, 1968, 1972).
Ignatius Paul Pinto, 97, Indian Roman Catholic prelate, bishop of Shimoga (1989–1998) and archbishop of Bangalore (1998–2004).
Ramón Saadi, 74, Argentine politician, MP (1987–1988, 2003–2009) and governor of Catamarca Province (1983–1991).
Wolfgang Schallenberg, 92, Austrian diplomat. 
Ivan Silayev, 92, Russian politician, prime minister of the Soviet Union (1991), chairman of the council of ministers (1990–1991) and minister of aviation industry (1981–1985).
Branka Veselinović, 104, Serbian actress (A Child of the Community).
Manousos Voloudakis, 56, Greek politician, MP (2007–2009, 2012–2014, since 2019).
Oscar Lawton Wilkerson, 96, American pilot (Tuskegee Airmen) and radio personality.

9
Marcos Alonso, 63, Spanish football player (Barcelona, Atlético Madrid, national team) and manager.
Ali al-Bahadili, 80, Iraqi politician, minister of agriculture (2005–2010).
Baracouda, 28, French racehorse.
György Czakó, 89, Hungarian Olympic figure skater (1952).
Jean-Maurice Dehousse, 86, Belgian politician, MP (1971–1981), minister-president of Wallonia (1982–1985), MEP (1999–2004).
Charlie Faulkner, 81, Welsh rugby union player (national team, British & Irish Lions) and coach (Newport RFC), heart failure.
Delano Franklyn, 63, Jamaican politician, senator (2002–2007).
Sıtkı Güvenç, 61, Turkish politician, MP (2011–2015), complications from injuries sustained in an earthquake.
Princess Marie Gabrielle, 97, Luxembourgish royal.
Doug Mattis, 56, American figure skater.
Marijke Merckens, 83, Dutch actress and singer (A Woman Like Eve, Honneponnetje).
O Kuk-ryol, 93, North Korean military officer, chief of the general staff (1980–1988) and vice chairman of the National Defence Commission (2009–2016), heart failure.
Nelson Rising, 81, American businessman (Federal Reserve Bank of San Francisco), complications from Alzheimer's disease.
Lewis Spratlan, 82, American music academic and composer, idiopathic pulmonary fibrosis.
Dimitrious Stanley, 48, American football player (New Jersey Red Dogs, Winnipeg Blue Bombers), prostate cancer.
Yukio Takano, 85, Japanese politician, mayor of Toshima (since 1999) and member of the Tokyo Metropolitan Assembly (1989–1999), COVID-19.
David Vaughan, 60, British climatologist, stomach cancer.
Sasa Zivoulovic, 50, Greek Olympic handball player (2004).

10
Marcel Adamczyk, 88, French footballer (FC Nancy, Lille, national team).
AKA, 35, South African rapper, shot. 
Morris J. Amitay, 86, American administrator, executive director of the American Israel Public Affairs Committee (1974–1980).
Amjad Islam Amjad, 78, Pakistani poet and screenwriter (Waris, Dehleez, Din), cardiac arrest.
Giovanni Bettini, 84, Italian architect and politician, deputy (1979–1983).
Len Birman, 90, Canadian-American actor (Silver Streak, Generations, Captain America).
Larry Coyer, 79, American football coach (Tampa Bay Buccaneers, Denver Broncos, Indianapolis Colts).
Sir Charles Gray, 94, Scottish politician, leader of the Strathclyde Regional Council (1986–1992).
Michael Green, 69, American molecular and cell biologist.
Toni Harper, 85, American singer.
Hugh Hudson, 86, English film director (Chariots of Fire, Greystoke: The Legend of Tarzan, Lord of the Apes, My Life So Far).
Satoshi Iriki, 55, Japanese baseball player (Kintetsu Buffaloes, Yomiuri Giants, Yakult Swallows), traffic collision.
Marguerite Jauzelon, 105, French volunteer paramedic.
Jacob L. Mey, 96, Dutch-born Danish professor of linguistics.
Hans Modrow, 95, German politician, chairman of the Council of Ministers of East Germany (1989–1990), MEP (1999–2004) and MP (1990–1994), stroke.
Samuel Moreno Rojas, 62, Colombian politician, senator (1991–2006), mayor of Bogotá (2008–2011), cardiac arrest.
Ron Roddan, 91, British athletics coach.
Carlos Saura, 91, Spanish film director (Mama Turns 100, Carmen, The Hunt), respiratory failure.
Mitsuo Shindō, 74, Japanese art director, stomach cancer.
Gautam Shome Sr., 62, Indian cricketer (Bengal).
René-Samuel Sirat, 92, French rabbi, chief rabbi of France (1981–1988).
Ben Steinberg, 93, Canadian composer, conductor and music educator.
Sergey Tereshchenko, 71, Kazakh politician, prime minister (1991–1994).
Nancy Tichborne, 80, New Zealand watercolour artist and gardener.
Zhai Zhonghe, 92, Chinese biologist, member of the Chinese Academy of Sciences.

11
Barrie Barbary, 84, Australian footballer (North Adelaide, Woodville).
Deniz Baykal, 84, Turkish politician, minister of foreign affairs and deputy prime minister (1995–1996).
Howard Bragman, 66, American public relations executive, leukemia.
Odd Eriksen, 67, Norwegian politician, minister of trade and industry (2005–2006) and governor of Nordland (2006–2013).
Adrien Fainsilber, 90, French architect.
Tito Fernández, 80, Chilean singer-songwriter.
James Flynn, 57, Irish film and television producer (Vikings, The Last Duel, The Banshees of Inisherin).
Brianna Ghey, 16, British transgender girl, stabbed.
Anatoly Grigoriev, 79, Russian physiologist.
Robert Hébras, 97, French massacre survivor (Oradour-sur-Glane).
Robert Dean Hunter, 94, American politician, member of the Texas House of Representatives (1986–2007).
Lee James, 69, American weightlifter, Olympic silver medalist (1976).
Jassim Ismail Juma, 85, Kuwaiti politician, MP (1971–1975).
Ivan Kováč, 74, Slovak middle-distance runner and radio sports commentator.
Simas Kudirka, 92, Lithuanian sailor (The Defection of Simas Kudirka).
Erwan Kurtubi, 72, Indonesian politician, regent of Pandeglang (2009–2010, 2011–2016).
Agnès Laroche, 57, French author and novelist.
Donald Spoto, 81, American biographer, brain hemorrhage.

12
Vadim Abdrashitov, 78, Russian film director (Fox Hunting, The Train Has Stopped, Planet Parade), cancer.
Lualhati Bautista, 77, Filipino novelist (Dekada '70, Bata, Bata... Pa'no Ka Ginawa?), screenwriter (Bulaklak sa City Jail) and activist.
Roger Bobo, 84, American tuba player.
Aimé Brisson, 94, Canadian politician, Quebec MNA (1962–1976).
Theo Dunne, 85, Irish football player (Shelbourne) and manager (UCD).
Enrich, 93, Spanish cartoonist.
Doug Fisher, 75, American football player (Pittsburgh Steelers).
Nadine Girault, 63, Canadian politician, Quebec MNA (2018–2022).
Nadia Hashem, Jordanian journalist (Al Ra'i) and politician.
Miloš Janoušek, 70, Slovak folk musician, stroke.
David Jolicoeur, 54, American rapper (De La Soul) and songwriter ("Me Myself and I", "Feel Good Inc."), Grammy winner (2006).
Brian Lee, 86, British football manager (Wycombe Wanderers).
Ted Lerner, 97, American real estate developer, owner of the Washington Nationals (since 2006) and founder of Lerner Enterprises, pneumonia.
Philippe Lopes-Curval, 71, French film director and screenwriter (The Chorus, Monsieur Batignole, Boudu).
Amazonino Mendes, 83, Brazilian politician, mayor of Manaus (2009–2012) and three-time governor of Amazonas, pneumonia.
Linda King Newell, 82, American historian and Mormon scholar (Mormon Enigma).
Franc' Pairon, 74, Belgian fashion designer, cancer.
Ramón Palacios Rubio, 102, Spanish engineer and politician, senator (1996–2000).
Yousef Al-Salem, 37, Saudi Arabian footballer (Al Qadsiah, Ettifaq, national team).
Narayan Satham, 73, Indian cricketer (Baroda).
Robert Sauzet, 95, French historian.
Eileen Sheridan, 99, English racing cyclist.
J. Paul Taylor, 102, American politician, member of the New Mexico House of Representatives (1987–2005).
W. Russell Todd, 94, American army major general.
Arne Treholt, 80, Norwegian politician and convicted spy.
Suat Türker, 46, Turkish-German footballer (Kickers Offenbach, TSF Ditzingen, İstanbulspor), heart attack.
Billy Two Rivers, 87, Canadian professional wrestler (GPW), actor (Black Robe), and chief of the Mohawks of Kahnawà:ke (1978–1998).

13
Reza Ali, 82, Bangladeshi politician, MP (2009–2014).
Thierry Alla, 67, French musicologist and composer.
Tim Aymar, 59, American heavy metal singer (Pharaoh).
Guido Basso, 85, Canadian jazz trumpeter.
Oleg Bejenar, 51, Ukrainian-Moldovan football player (Tiligul Tiraspol, Dinamo Bender) and manager (Speranța Crihana Veche), heart attack.
Roger Bonk, 78, American football player (North Dakota Fighting Sioux, Winnipeg Blue Bombers).
Marshall "Eddie" Conway, 76, American Black Panther Party leader.
Conrad Dobler, 72, American football player (St. Louis Cardinals, New Orleans Saints, Buffalo Bills).
Brian DuBois, 55, American baseball player (Detroit Tigers).
Mikaela Fabricius-Bjerre, 53, Finnish Olympic dressage rider (2012), cancer.
Pierre Garcia, 79, French football player and manager (Stade Briochin, Rennes).
Robert Geddes, 99, American architect, dean of the Princeton University School of Architecture (1965–1982).
José María Gil-Robles, 87, Spanish politician, president of the European Parliament (1997–1999).
Alain Goraguer, 91, French jazz pianist, arranger and film composer (Fantastic Planet, Saint Laurent).
Milan Hamada, 89, Slovak literary critic.
Lalita Lajmi, 90, Indian painter.
Carl-Åke Ljung, 88, Swedish Olympic sprint canoer (1956).
Tom Luddy, 79, American film producer (Barfly, The Secret Garden), co-founder of the Telluride Film Festival.
Leiji Matsumoto, 85, Japanese manga artist (Space Battleship Yamato, Galaxy Express 999, Space Pirate Captain Harlock), heart failure.
Zia Mohyeddin, 91, British-Pakistani actor (Lawrence of Arabia, Khartoum, Ashanti) and television broadcaster.
Chris Mushohwe, 69, Zimbabwean politician, senator (2008–2018).
Kéné Ndoye, 44, Senegalese Olympic track and field athlete (2000, 2004).
Deirdre Purcell, 77, Irish author, journalist and stage actor.
Nektarios Santorinios, 50, Greek politician, MP (since 2015), cancer.
Suzanne Sens, 92, French author and teacher.
Shi Zhongci, 89, Chinese mathematician, member of the Chinese Academy of Sciences.
David Singmaster, 84, American mathematician.
Huey "Piano" Smith, 89, American R&B pianist and songwriter ("Rockin' Pneumonia and the Boogie Woogie Flu").
Jesse Treviño, 76, Mexican-American painter, throat cancer.
István Varga, 62, Hungarian Olympic judoka (1988).
Spencer Wiggins, 81, American soul singer.
Oliver Wood, 80, British cinematographer (The Bourne Ultimatum, Face/Off, Morbius), cancer.

14
Afternoon Deelites, 30, American Thoroughbred racehorse, euthanized.
Javed Khan Amrohi, 73, Indian actor (Andaz Apna Apna, Lagaan, Chak De! India), respiratory failure.
Viktor Aristov, 84, Ukrainian football player (Metalist Kharkiv, SKA Odesa, Energiya Volzhsky) and coach.
Friedrich Cerha, 96, Austrian composer, conductor, and music educator.
Mikhael Daher, 94, Lebanese lawyer and politician, MP (1972–1996, 2000–2005), minister of education (1992–1995).
Roger Ellis, 93, British headmaster.
Charley Ferguson, 83, American football player (Buffalo Bills, Cleveland Browns, Minnesota Vikings).
Emil C. Gotschlich, 88, American chemist, developer of the meningitis vaccine.
Allen Green, 84, American football player (Dallas Cowboys).
Anthony Green, 83, English painter and printmaker.
Gary L. Harrell, 71, American major general, glioblastoma.
Jerry Jarrett, 80, American Hall of Fame professional wrestler (NWA Mid-America) and promoter, founder of CWA and NWA:TNA.
Hrvoje Kačić, 91, Croatian legal scholar, politician and water polo player, Olympic silver medallist (1956).
Wim Kras, 79, Dutch footballer (Volendam).
William Joseph Kurtz, 87, Polish Roman Catholic prelate, bishop of Kundiawa (1982–1999), coadjutor archbishop (1999–2001) and archbishop (2001–2010) of Madang.
Greg McMackin, 77, American football coach (Oregon Tech Hustlin' Owls, Hawaii Warriors).
Marwan G. Najjar, 76, Lebanese screenwriter.
Christine Pritchard, 79, British actress (Cara Fi, The Indian Doctor, O Na! Y Morgans!).
Peter Renkens, 55, Belgian singer (Confetti's). (death announced on this date)
Serge Roullet, 96, French film director and screenwriter (The Wall, Benito Cereno).
Baxtiyor Sayfullayev, 71, Uzbek politician, minister of culture (2012–2020), senator (since 2020).
Vito Schlickmann, 94, Brazilian Roman Catholic prelate, auxiliary bishop of Florianópolis (1995–2004).
Antoine Stinco, 89, French architect.
Neale Stoner, 88, American sports coach and athletic director.
Kudarikoti Annadanayya Swamy, 87, Indian jurist, chief justice of Madras High Court (1993–1997).
Dame Kathrin Thomas, 78, British public servant, lord lieutenant of Mid Glamorgan (2003–2019).
Shoichiro Toyoda, 97, Japanese automotive executive, chairman of Toyota Motor Corporation (1992–1999).
John M. Veitch, 77, American Hall of Fame racehorse trainer.

15
Paul Berg, 96, American biochemist, Nobel Prize laureate (1980).
Kevin Bird, 70, English footballer (Mansfield Town, Huddersfield Town).
Thomas Dortch, 72, American businessman and civil rights leader, pancreatic cancer.
James Fleming, 83, Canadian journalist and politician, MP (1972–1984), minister of state for multiculturalism (1980–1983).
Shōzō Iizuka, 89, Japanese voice actor (Mobile Suit Gundam, Fist of the North Star, Dragon Ball Z), heart failure.
Paul Jerrard, 57, Canadian ice hockey player (Minnesota North Stars) and coach (Colorado Avalanche, Calgary Flames), cancer.
Ron Johnson, 84, Australian footballer (Richmond).
Catherine McArdle Kelleher, 84, American political scientist.
Gummadi Kuthuhalamma, 73, Indian politician, Andhra Pradesh MLA (1985–2014).
Zaenal Ma'arif, 67, Indonesian politician, MP (2004–2007).
Leone Manti, 79, Italian politician, deputy (1992–1994).
Giampiero Neri, 95, Italian poet.
Oh Takbeon, 79, South Korean writer, poet and literary critic.
David Oreck, 99, American entrepreneur.
Dario Penne, 84, Italian actor (E le stelle stanno a guardare) and voice actor.
Qian Guoliang, 83, Chinese general, commander of the Jinan (1993–1996) and the Shenyang Military Region (1999–2004).
Gilbert Rist, 84, Swiss educator.
Hans-Christian Siebke, 82, German farmer and politician, member of the Landtag of Schleswig-Holstein (1996–2000).
Brigitte Smadja, 67–68, Tunisian-born French author.
Grzegorz Skrzecz, 65, Polish Olympic boxer (1980).
Kerstin Tidelius, 88, Swedish actress (Fanny and Alexander, Ådalen 31, Hem till byn).
Raquel Welch, 82, American actress (One Million Years B.C., The Three Musketeers, Fantastic Voyage).
John E. Woods, 80, American translator.
Xu Binshi, 91, Chinese engineer, member of the Chinese Academy of Engineering.
Algimantas Žižiūnas, 83, Lithuanian photographer.

16
Jana Andrsová, 83, Czech ballerina and actress (The Strakonice Bagpiper, Jak se Franta naučil bát).
Tulsidas Balaram, 86, Indian footballer (Hyderabad City Police, East Bengal, national team), multiple organ failure.
Sham Binda, 69, Surinamese entrepreneur and politician, MP (since 2020).
Michel Deville, 91, French film director (The Reader, Le Voyage en douce, Death in a French Garden).
Colin Dobson, 82, English footballer (Sheffield Wednesday, Huddersfield Town, Bristol Rovers).
Simone Edwards, 49, Jamaican-American basketball player (Seattle Storm), ovarian cancer.
John Fedosoff, 90, Canadian football player (Toronto Argonauts, Hamilton Tiger-Cats, Saskatchewan Roughriders).
Kim Fripp, 70, Canadian Olympic ski jumper (1976).
Héctor Mario Gómez Galvarriato, 85, Mexican engineer, inventor and businessman.
Gunnar Heinsohn, 79, German author, sociologist and economist.
Alex Herrera, 43, Venezuelan baseball player (Cleveland Indians).
Chuck Jackson, 85, American R&B singer ("Any Day Now", "I Keep Forgettin'", "Tell Him I'm Not Home").
Maon Kurosaki, 35, Japanese pop singer.
Jatu Lahiri, 86, Indian politician, West Bengal MLA (1991–2006, 2011–2016).
Tim Lobinger, 50, German Olympic pole vaulter (1996, 2000, 2004), leukaemia.
J.D. MacFarlane, 89, American politician, Colorado Attorney General (1975–1983).
Marilú, 95, Mexican singer and actress (El barchante Neguib).
Tony Marshall, 85, German Schlager and opera singer.
Tim McCarver, 81, American baseball player (St. Louis Cardinals, Philadelphia Phillies) and broadcaster (Fox Sports), heart failure.
Yvette Monginou, 95, French Olympic athlete (1948, 1952).
Aníbal Palma, 87, Chilean politician and diplomat, minister general secretariat of government (1973), minister of education (1972) and housing and urbanism (1973).
Gunvor Pontén, 94, Swedish actress (Violence, Tic Tac, Spring of Joy).
Helen Fogwill Porter, 92, Canadian author.
Alberto Radius, 80, Italian guitarist and singer-songwriter (Formula 3).
Marie Borge Refsum, 95, Norwegian politician.
Giorgio Ruffolo, 96, Italian politician, MP (1983–1994) and minister of the environment (1987–1992).
Hank Skinner, 60, American convicted murderer.
Stratis Stratigis, 89, Greek lawyer and politician, MP (1985–1989).
Mario Vitti, 96, Italian philologist.
Mario Zurlini, 80, Italian football player (Napoli, F.C. Matera) and coach (Savoia).

17
Yuth Angkinan, 86, Thai politician, MP (1983–2001).
Alparslan Arslan, 45–46, Turkish convicted murderer, suicide by hanging.
Otis Barthoulameu, 71, American musician (Fluf, Olivelawn) and record producer (Cheshire Cat).
Don Blackburn, 84, Canadian ice hockey player (Philadelphia Flyers, New York Islanders, New York Rangers).
Rebecca Blank, 67, American economist and academic administrator, acting secretary of commerce (2011, 2012–2013) and chancellor of UW-Madison (2013–2022), cancer.
Elda Cerrato, 92, Argentine artist.
Amritpal Chotu, Indian comedian and actor (Sardaar Ji, Ravanan).
Keith Christensen, 75, American football player (New Orleans Saints, Edmonton Eskimos).
Jenny Clève, 92, French actress (F comme Fairbanks, One Deadly Summer, Welcome to the Sticks).
Michaël Denard, 78, German-born French dancer and actor.
Jerry Dodgion, 90, American jazz saxophonist and flautist, complications from an infection.
Moses Elisaf, 68, Greek politician, mayor of Ioannina (since 2019), cancer.
Gerald Fried, 95, American film and television composer (Paths of Glory, The Killing, Star Trek), pneumonia.
Ángela Gurría, 93, Mexican sculptor.
John Holdsworth, 76, English rugby league referee.
Kyle Jacobs, 49, American songwriter ("More Than a Memory"), suicide by gunshot.
James A. Joseph, 87, American diplomat, ambassador to South Africa (1996–1999).
Vijay Kichlu, 92, Indian classical singer, heart attack.
Henry LaFont, Puerto Rican actor and comedian.
André Le Goupil, 92, French Olympic equestrian (1968).
Patti Love, 75, British actress (That'll Be the Day, The Long Good Friday, Mrs Henderson Presents).
John Mason, 78, Indian schoolmaster and educationist.
Henrietta Mbawah, 34, Sierra Leonean actress and social activist.
George T. Miller, 79, Scottish-born Australian film director (The Man from Snowy River, The NeverEnding Story II: The Next Chapter, Zeus and Roxanne), heart attack.
Peter Muller, 95, Australian architect.
George Myers, 83, Jamaican-born Bahamian hotelier, vice president of Resorts International (1977–1992).
Peter Nanfuri, 80, Ghanaian police officer, inspector general of police (1996–2001).
, 78, Spanish flamenco singer, brain cancer.
Hans Poulsen, 77, Australian singer and songwriter.
Shahnawaz Pradhan, 56, Indian actor (Alif Laila, Hari Mirchi Lal Mirchi, Phantom), heart attack.
Malik Mohammad Qayyum, 79, Pakistani lawyer, attorney general (2007–2008).
João Maurício Fernandes Salgueiro, 88, Portuguese economist and politician, minister of finance (1981–1983).
Maurizio Scaparro, 91, Italian stage director.
Stella Stevens, 84, American actress (Girls! Girls! Girls!, The Nutty Professor, The Poseidon Adventure), complications from Alzheimer's disease.
Arne Tumyr, 89, Norwegian journalist (Nybrott, Sørlandet, Fædrelandsvennen) and politician.
Lee Whitlock, 54, British actor (Shine on Harvey Moon, Cassandra's Dream, Grange Hill).
Tom Whitlock, 68, American songwriter ("Danger Zone", "Take My Breath Away", "Winner Takes It All"), Oscar winner (1987), complications from Alzheimer's disease.

18
Clemens Arvay, 42, Austrian biologist and writer, suicide.
Peter Bonnet, 86, British major general.
Barbara Bosson, 83, American actress (Hill Street Blues, The Last Starfighter, Murder One).
Jim Broyhill, 95, American politician, member of the U.S. House of Representatives (1963–1986) and Senate (1986).
Ilario Castagner, 82, Italian football player and manager (Perugia, Milan, Inter Milan).
Robert Cazala, 89, French road racing cyclist.
Gabriel Chen-Ying Ly, 93, Taiwanese philosopher, president of Fu Jen Catholic University (1992–1996).
Thomas R. Donahue, 94, American labor leader, president of the AFL–CIO (1995), complications from a fall.
Peter Herrndorf, 82, Canadian lawyer and television executive, chairman of TVOntario (1992–1999).
Huang Da, 97, Chinese economist and academic administrator, president of the Renmin University of China (1991–1994).
Cam Jacobs, 60, American football player (Tampa Bay Buccaneers), complications from cardiac arrest.
Ammon McNeely, 52, American rock climber.
David G. O'Connell, 69, Irish-born American Roman Catholic prelate, auxiliary bishop of Los Angeles (since 2015), shot.
Yoshihisa Okumura, 96, Japanese engineer.
Ahmet Suat Özyazıcı, 87, Turkish football player (İdmanocağı) and manager (Trabzonspor).
Taraka Ratna, 39, Indian actor (Okato Number Kurraadu, Yuva Rathna, Taarak), cardiac arrest.
Terry Rodgers, 80, Australian footballer (Essendon).
Justin O. Schmidt, 75, American entomologist, complications from Parkinson's disease.
Richard H. Tilly, 90, American economic historian.
Peter Wolfenden, 88, New Zealand Hall of Fame harness racing driver and trainer.
Petar Zhekov, 78, Bulgarian football player (Beroe, CSKA Sofia) and manager, Olympic silver medallist (1968).

19
Richard Belzer, 78, American actor (Homicide: Life on the Street, Law & Order: Special Victims Unit, The Flash), comedian, and author.
Dickie Davies, 94, British television presenter (World of Sport).
Greg Foster, 64, American hurdler, Olympic silver medalist (1984).
David Lance Goines, 77, American artist.
Pierre Haïk, 72, French lawyer, complications from Alzheimer's disease.
Nazmul Huda, 80, Bangladeshi politician, minister of communications (2001–2006), minister of information (1991–1996) and MP (1991–2006).
Ferenc Jánosi, 84, Hungarian Olympic volleyball player (1964).
Jean Le Garrec, 93, French politician, deputy (1981, 1986–1993, 1997–2007).
Mayilsamy, 57, Indian actor (Manathile Oru Paattu, Vaimaye Vellum, Thai Poranthachu) and comedian, heart attack.
Ebrima Mballow, Gambian diplomat and politician, minister of the interior (2018–2019).
Red McCombs, 95, American businessman and sports team owner (San Antonio Spurs, Minnesota Vikings), co-founder of iHeartMedia.
Henry McDonald, 57, Northern Irish writer and journalist (The Guardian, The Observer), cancer.
Jim McMillin, 85, American football player (Denver Broncos, Oakland Raiders).
Christopher Nupen, 88, South African filmmaker.
Jansen Panettiere, 28, American actor (The Secrets of Jonathan Sperry, The X's, Robots), cardiomegaly.
Daniel Roche, 87, French historian.
S. N. M. Ubayadullah, 81, Indian politician, Tamil Nadu MLA (1989–1991, 1996–2006).
Rolf Wirtén, 91, Swedish politician, minister of economics (1981–1982) and MP (1966–1983).

20
Bruce Barthol, 75, American bassist (Country Joe and the Fish).
S. K. Bhagavan, 89, Indian film director, producer and screenwriter (Goa Dalli CID 999, Pratidwani, Chandanada Gombe).
Bela Bose, 80, Indian actress (Shikar, Jeene Ki Raah, Jai Santoshi Maa) and dancer.
Victor Brox, 81, English blues musician.
George B. Dertilis, 84, Greek historian.
Şener Eruygur, 81, Turkish military officer, general commander of the gendarmerie (2002–2004).
Semyon Gershtein, 93, Russian physicist, member of the Russian Academy of Sciences.
Michael S. Heiser, 60, American biblical scholar and author, pancreatic cancer.
Husnie Hentihu, 72, Indonesian politician.
John Hitt, 82, American academic administrator, president of the University of Central Florida (1992–2018).
Om Prakash Kohli, 87, Indian politician, governor of Gujarat (2014–2019) and MP (1994–2000).
Miklós Lendvai, 47, Hungarian footballer (Zalaegerszegi, Ferencvárosi, national team), suicide.
Rick Newman, 81, American comedy club owner (Catch a Rising Star), pancreatic cancer.
Jim Savage, 86, New Zealand athlete, archer and table tennis player, Paralympic bronze medalist (1972, 1976).
Ken Warby, 83, Australian motorboat racer, holder of the water speed record (since 1977).

21
Ron Altbach, 76, American keyboardist (King Harvest, Celebration) and songwriter ("Alone on Christmas Day").
Amancio, 83, Spanish football player (Real Madrid, national team) and manager (Real Madrid).
Iris de Araújo, 79, Brazilian politician, deputy (2007–2015).
Abby Choi, 28, Hong Kong socialite and model.
Zandra Flemister, 71, American diplomat.
Ricardo García García-Ochoa, 78, Spanish lawyer and politician, member of the Cortes of Castile and León (1987–1991).
Jesse Gress, 67, American rock guitarist.
Helen Hutchinson, 88–89, Canadian broadcaster and media personality.
Iraj Kalantari Taleghani, 85, Iranian architect.
J. B. Kristiadi, 76, Indonesian civil servant.
Mimika Luca, 85, Albanian actress (Our Friend Tili, Botë e padukshme, A Tale from the Past) and dancer.
Albie Pearson, 88, American baseball player (Los Angeles/California Angels, Washington Senators, Baltimore Orioles).
Rayford Price, 86, American politician, member (1961–1973) and speaker (1972–1973) of the Texas House of Representatives.
Simone Segouin, 97, French Resistance fighter.
Eva Siracká, 96, Slovak physician.
Marian Skubacz, 64, Polish Olympic wrestler (1988).
Nadja Tiller, 93, Austrian actress (Rosemary, The Rough and the Smooth, Wanted: Babysitter).

22
Pascual Babiloni, 76, Spanish footballer (Castellón, Real Madrid, Benicarló).
André Bailly, 81, Belgian politician, member of the Parliament of Wallonia (2001–2004).
Mick Burns, 85, Irish hurler (Nenagh Éire Óg, Tipperary).
, 85, Russian actor (The Last Day, Ballad of an Old Gun, Tycoon).
Guremu Demboba, 88, Ethiopian Olympic road cyclist (1956, 1960).
, 73, Hungarian actor (Angi Vera, Made in Hungaria, Bizalom).
Ellen Inga O. Hætta, 69, Norwegian politician.
Giorgos Katsoulis, 60, Greek water polo player (Olympiacos) and coach, cancer.
Howard R. Lamar, 99, American historian, president of Yale University (1992–1993).
Tatiana Lobo, 83, Chilean-born Costa Rican writer.
Mats Löfving, 61, Swedish police officer, deputy director of the Swedish Police Authority (2014–2018).
Dylan Lyons, 24, American television journalist (Spectrum News 13), shot.
Bruno Mahlow, 85, German diplomat.
Germano Mathias, 88, Brazilian samba singer.
Román Mejías, 97, Cuban baseball player (Pittsburgh Pirates, Boston Red Sox).
Augie Nieto, 65, American businessman, founder of Life Fitness, complications from amyotrophic lateral sclerosis.
Ahmed Qurei, 85, Palestinian politician, prime minister (2003–2006).
Kanak Rele, 85, Indian classical dancer.
Stanislav Štefkovič, 93, Slovak decathlete.
Subi Suresh, 41, Indian actress (Happy Husbands, Drama, Panchavarnathatha) and television anchor, liver disease.
Tasuku Tsukada, 86, Japanese politician, mayor of Nagano (1985–2001).
Philip Ziegler, 93, British biographer and historian, cancer.

23
Bernard Bellec, 88, French politician, mayor of Niort (1986–2002).
Slim Borgudd, 76, Swedish racing driver and drummer (Lea Riders Group).
François Couchepin, 88, Swiss lawyer and politician, chancellor (1991–1999).
Andrée Desautels, 99, Canadian musician, musicologist and music educator.
Donald Dillbeck, 59, American convicted murderer, execution by lethal injection.
Tony Earl, 86, American politician, governor of Wisconsin (1983–1987) and member of the Wisconsin State Assembly (1969–1975), stroke.
Syd Fischer, 95, Australian property developer and sailor.
Salundik Gohong, 76, Indonesian army officer and politician, mayor of Palangka Raya (1998–2003).
Mohd Kamal Hassan, 80, Malaysian Islamic scholar, rector of the IIUM (1998–2006), complications from surgery.
Hasan Ali Khan, 71, Indian businessman.
Junnosuke Kuroda, 34, Japanese rock musician (Sumika).
Thomas H. Lee, 78, American financier, founder of Thomas H. Lee Partners and Lee Equity Partners, suicide by gunshot.
José Lei, 92, Hong Kong Olympic sport shooter (1968) and civil servant.
Adam Lisewski, 79, Polish fencer, Olympic bronze medallist (1968).
John Motson, 77, English football commentator (BBC Sport, Talksport).
Giuseppe Nirta, 82, Italian mobster, heart disease.
John Olver, 86, American politician, member of the U.S. House of Representatives (1991–2013), member of the Massachusetts Senate (1973–1991) and House of Representatives (1969–1973).
Bob Perryman, 58, American football player (New England Patriots, Denver Broncos).
Jack Sheedy, 96, Australian Hall of Fame football player (East Fremantle, Western Australia) and coach (East Perth).
Allen Steck, 96, American mountaineer and rock climber.
Irving Wardle, 93, English theatre critic and writer.

24
James Abourezk, 92, American politician, member of the U.S. House of Representatives (1971–1973) and Senate (1973–1979).
Giorgos Adamopoulos, 76–77, Greek lawyer and politician, MP (1989–2000).
Vic Anciaux, 91, Belgian doctor and politician, MP (1965–1995).
Bae Duk-kwang, 74, South Korean politician, MNA (2014–2018).
Michael Blackwood, 88, American documentary filmmaker.
Eduardo Burguete, 61, Spanish Olympic pentathlete (1984).
Maurizio Costanzo, 84, Italian television host, journalist, and screenwriter (The House with Laughing Windows, A Special Day, Zeder), complications from surgery.
Ed Fury, 94, American bodybuilder and actor (Ursus, The Seven Revenges, Ursus in the Land of Fire).
Adolf Goetzberger, 94, German physicist.
Víctor Gómez Bergés, 82, Dominican lawyer, jurist and diplomat, minister of foreign affairs (1972–1975) and judge of the Constitutional Court (2011–2018).
Felipe González González, 76, Mexican politician, governor of Aguascalientes (1998–2004) and senator (2006–2012).
Sir Bernard Ingham, 90, British journalist and civil servant, Downing Street press secretary (1979–1990).
Juraj Jakubisko, 84, Slovak film director (Birds, Orphans and Fools, The Millennial Bee, The Feather Fairy) and screenwriter.
Walter Liese, 97, German forestry and wood researcher and wood biologist.
Walter Mirisch, 101, American film producer (In the Heat of the Night, Midway, The Hawaiians), Oscar winner (1967).
Edith Roger, 100, Norwegian dancer and choreographer.
Georgios Romeos, 88, Greek writer and politician, MEP (1984–1993).
, 80, Canadian public servant and business executive.
Devisingh Ransingh Shekhawat, 89, Indian politician, first gentleman (2007–2012) and Maharashtra MLA (1985–1990), complications from a fall.
David L. Starling, 73, American railroad executive (Kansas City Southern Railway).
Tom Tierney, 46, Irish rugby union player (national team) and coach.
Teodor Țîrdea, 85, Moldovan professor and philosopher.
, 49, Syrian actor, stroke.

25
Torbjörn Axelman, 90, Swedish television producer, director, and writer.
Victor Babiuc, 84, Romanian jurist and politician, MP (1990, 1992–2004) and minister of national defence (1996–2000).
Jack Billion, 83, American politician, member of the South Dakota House of Representatives (1993–1997).
, 78, Russian actress (Gunpowder, Tragedy, Rock Style, It Is Easy to Die).
Ernest L. Daman, 99, German-born American mechanical engineer, inventor, and business executive, president of the American Society of Mechanical Engineers (1988–1989).
Walter Ferguson, 103, Panamanian-born Costa Rican calypso singer-songwriter.
François Hadji-Lazaro, 66, French actor (Cemetery Man, The City of Lost Children, Dante 01), musician and producer, sepsis.
Allan Hotchkin, 79, Australian footballer (South Melbourne).
Kris Jordan, 46, American politician, member of the Ohio House of Representatives (2009–2010, since 2019) and Senate (2011–2018), diabetic reaction.
Sir David Lumsden, 94, British musician and choirmaster.
Corinna Miazga, 39, German politician, member of the Bundestag (since 2017), breast cancer.
Fred Miller, 82, American football player (Baltimore Colts).
Dave Nicholson, 83, American baseball player (Baltimore Orioles, Chicago White Sox, Houston Astros).
François Engongah Owono, 77, Gabonese politician, MP (2001–2006).
Sixtus Josef Parzinger, 91, Austrian-Chilean Roman Catholic prelate, bishop of Villarrica (2001–2009).
Martin Pěnička, 53, Czech footballer (Slavia Prague, Sporting Lokeren, Stavo Artikel Brno).
Gordon Pinsent, 92, Canadian actor (Away from Her, Babar, The Red Green Show), cerebral hemorrhage.
Vijay Salvi, 84, Indian actor.
Carl Saunders, 80, American jazz trumpeter, composer and educator.
Mitsuo Senda, 82, Japanese voice actor (Golgo 13, Sherlock Hound, Naruto), heart failure.
Mihai Șora, 106, Romanian philosopher, essayist, and politician, minister of teaching (1989–1990).
Traute, Princess of Lippe, 98, German princess.
Richard Trefry, 98, American army lieutenant general, inspector general of the U.S. Army (1977–1983).
Ali Yafie, 96, Indonesian Islamic scholar, chairman of the Indonesian Ulema Council (1990–2000).
, 86, Chinese film art director (Temptation of a Monk, The Phantom Lover, The Soong Sisters).

26
Ali Al-Baghli, 76, Kuwaiti politician, minister of oil (1992–1996).
Béchir Ben Slama, 91, Tunisian politician, minister of culture (1981–1986).
Betty Boothroyd, Baroness Boothroyd, 93, British politician, member (1973–2000) and speaker (1992–2000) of the House of Commons and member of the House of Lords (since 2001).
Alberto Mario González, 81, Argentine footballer (Boca Juniors, national team).
Terry Holland, 80, American basketball coach (Davidson Wildcats, Virginia Cavaliers), complications from Alzheimer's disease.
Ted Knap, 102, American journalist.
Jim Lewis, 88, British racehorse owner (Best Mate), kidney failure.
Günther von Lojewski, 87, German journalist, television presenter, and author.
Mário Lucunde, 65, Angolan Roman Catholic prelate, bishop of Menongue (2005–2018).
Curzio Maltese, 63, Italian journalist (la Repubblica, La Gazzetta dello Sport) and politician, MEP (2014–2019).
, 105, Norwegian military officer.
Gus Franklin Mutscher, 90, American politician, speaker of the Texas House of Representatives (1969–1972).
Tony O'Donoghue, 86, Irish sports commentator.
Valeria Ogășanu, 76, Romanian actress (Michael the Brave, The Yellow Rose).
Francisco Osorto, 65, Salvadoran footballer (Santiagueño, Municipal Limeño, national team), liver failure.
Tom Pendry, Baron Pendry, 88, British politician, MP (1970–2001) and member of the House of Lords (since 2001).
Shahida Raza, Pakistani field hockey player (national team), boat accident.
Bob Richards, 97, American pole vaulter and politician, Olympic champion (1952, 1956).
Amy Schwartz, 68, American author and illustrator.
Ziya Şengül, 78–79, Turkish footballer (Fenerbahçe, national team), organ failure.
Fred Shabel, 90, American basketball coach (UConn Huskies).
Mohammed Stuart, 77, Namibian politician, member of the National Assembly (1990–1999).
Sandy Valdespino, 84, Cuban baseball player (Minnesota Twins, Atlanta Braves, Milwaukee Brewers).
Ans Westra, 86, Dutch-born New Zealand photographer (Washday at the Pa).

27
Nobuo Ariga, 58,  Japanese singer-songwriter, bassist, and record producer, prostate cancer.
Jean Balfour, 95, Scottish forester, landowner and conservationist.
Florin Beciu, 54, Romanian actor.
Hans-Joachim Behrendt, 68, German drummer (Ideal).
Chester Borrows, 65, New Zealand politician, MP (2005–2017), minister for courts (2011–2014), deputy speaker of the House of Representatives (2014–2017), cancer.
Ricou Browning, 93, American actor (Creature from the Black Lagoon, Revenge of the Creature) and television director (Flipper).
Eduardo Burguete, 61, Spanish Olympic pentathlete (1984).
Srutimala Duara, 57, Indian writer, ovarian cancer.
, 72, Belarusian playwright, screenwriter (White Dew, Fortress of War) and actor.
Paul East, 76, New Zealand politician, MP (1978–1999), attorney-general (1990–1997) and minister of defence (1996–1997).
Koo Kwang-ming, 96, Taiwanese independence activist.
Gérard Latortue, 88, Haitian politician, prime minister (2004–2006) and foreign minister (1988), fall.
Li Yining, 92, Chinese economist.
Óscar López Balestra, 88, Uruguayan politician, deputy (1972–1973, 1985–1990).
Burny Mattinson, 87, American animator (The Great Mouse Detective, Robin Hood) and screenwriter (Beauty and the Beast).
Tom McLeish, 60, British theoretical physicist.
Juan Muñoz Martín, 93, Spanish children's author (El Barco de Vapor).
Gleb Pavlovsky, 71, Russian political scientist.
Shen Zulun, 91, Chinese politician, governor of Zhejiang (1988–1990).
Filipp Sidorsky, 85, Russian diplomat, ambassador to Uzbekistan (1992–1997) and to Bosnia and Herzegovina (1998–2000).
Jerry Simmons, 76, American tennis coach (LSU Tigers).
Chrysostomos A. Sofianos, 83, Cypriot educator and politician, co-founder of CNTI.
Ismaïla Touré, 73, Senegalese musician (Touré Kunda).
Juha Valjakkala, 57, Finnish convicted murderer.
, 84, Russian metallurgist and politician.
Sammy Winston, 44, English footballer (Tottenham Hotspur, Leyton Orient).

28
Abdoh Besisi, 45, Saudi Arabian footballer (Al Ahli, Al-Ansar, Ohod).
Doina Botez, 72, Romanian visual artist.
Michael Botticelli, 63, American Olympic figure skater (1980).
Yvonne Constant, 92, French actress (Gigot, Monkeys, Go Home!, Their Last Night), singer and ballerina.
Brian J. Donnelly, 76, American politician and diplomat, member of the U.S. House of Representatives (1979–1993) and ambassador to Trinidad and Tobago (1994–1997).
Jean Faut, 98, American baseball player (South Bend Blue Sox).
Jimmy Hatton, 88, Irish Gaelic footballer and hurler (Kilcoole, Wicklow GAA).
Bo Hickey, 77, American football player (Montreal Alouettes, Brooklyn Dodgers, Denver Broncos).
Geneviève Lhermitte, 56, Belgian convicted murderer, assisted suicide.
Fred Marolewski, 94, American baseball player (St. Louis Cardinals).
Pelayo Novo, 32, Spanish footballer (Oviedo, Elche), hit by train.
Brian O'Brien, 83, Irish rugby union player (national team) and manager.
Pirouz, 10 months, Iranian Asiatic cheetah, kidney failure.
Tony Scherman, 72, Canadian painter, cancer.
Javad Tabatabai, 77, Iranian philosopher and political scientist.
Indrek Toome, 79, Estonian politician, chairman of the Council of Ministers (1988–1990).
Grant Turner, 64, New Zealand footballer (Stop Out, national team), cancer.
Jay Weston, 93, American film producer (Lady Sings the Blues, Buddy Buddy).

References

2023-2
2